Chukwubuike Junior Adamu (born 6 June 2001) is a professional footballer who plays as a forward for Austrian Bundesliga club Red Bull Salzburg. Born in Nigeria, he plays for the Austria national team.

Club career
Adamu started his  career with the youth team of GSV Wacker. In January  2014 he came to Grazer AK. In 2015, he joined the FC Red Bull Salzburg Academy, where he progressed through the levels from U15 to U18. 

In September 2017, he was included in the FC Liefering squad for the first time. In the same month, he also debuted for Red Bull Salzburg's UEFA Youth League team, coming on for Nicolas Meister in a match against Bordeaux. 

He made his professional debut playing for FC Liefering against WSG Wattens in November 2018 as he came in for Karim Adeyemi. In September 2020, he made his debut for Red Bull Salzburg in an Austrian Cup match against SW Bregen, coming on in the 75th minute for Masaya Okugawa.

On 15 February 2021, Adamu moved on loan to Swiss Super League team St. Gallen.

Adamu scored his first goal for Red Bull Salzburg in a 1–0 league win over Admira on 14 August 2021. The goal sealed Salzburg's fifth victory on the road in a row, the longest such run the club had had in a decade. Three days later, he made his first appearance in the UEFA Champions League, coming on as a substitute in a 2–1 home win over Danish champions Brøndby in the first leg of their play-off round clash. On 16 February 2022, Adamu scored his first UEFA Champions League goal in a 1–1 home draw against Bundesliga champions Bayern Munich in the first leg of the round of 16 tie after coming on as a substitute for Noah Okafor.

International career
Born in Nigeria, Adamu represents Austria at international level and has played for the Austria U18, Austria U19, and Austria U21 teams.

He made his first appearance in the Austria national football team on 12 November 2021 in a World Cup qualifier match vs. Israel.

Career statistics

Club

International

Honours
Red Bull Salzburg
 Austrian Bundesliga: 2021–22
 Austrian Cup: 2021–22

References

Living people
2001 births
Sportspeople from Kano
Austrian footballers
Nigerian footballers
FC Red Bull Salzburg players
FC Liefering players
Austrian people of Nigerian descent
Nigerian emigrants to Austria
Association football forwards
2. Liga (Austria) players
Austria international footballers
Austria under-21 international footballers
Austria youth international footballers